Mladenov, feminine Mladenova is a Macedonian and Bulgarian surname derived from the first name Mladen. It may refer to:
 Aleksandar Mladenov (born 1982), Bulgarian footballer
 Atanas Mladenov (born 1960), Bulgarian high jumper
 Daniel Mladenov (born 1987), Bulgarian footballer
 Dessislava Mladenova (born 1988), Bulgarian tennis player
 Dimitar Mladenov (born 1962), Bulgarian footballer 
 Georgi Mladenov (born 1962), Bulgarian basketball player and coach 
 Hristo Mladenov (1928–1996), Bulgarian footballer
 Ivaylo Mladenov (born 1973), Bulgarian long jumper
 Lachezar Mladenov (born 1972),  Bulgarian footballer
 Lazar Mladenov (1854–1918), Bulgarian priest
 Mladen Mladenov (born 1957), Bulgarian wrestler
 Nedyalko Mladenov (born 1961), Bulgarian footballer
 Nickolay Mladenov (born 1972), Bulgarian politician, UN diplomat
 Nikola Mladenov (1964–2013), Macedonian journalist 
 Petar Mladenov (1936–2000), Bulgarian communist politician, Bulgarian head of state 1989–1990
 Stefan Mladenov (1880–1963), Bulgarian linguist
 Stoian Mladenov, Bulgarian footballer
 Stoycho Mladenov (born 1957), Bulgarian footballer
 Stoycho Mladenov Jr. (born 1985), Bulgarian footballer 
 Vasko Mladenov (born 1989), Bulgarian tennis player 
 Yuri Mladenov (born 1977), Bulgarian boxer 

Bulgarian-language surnames
Patronymic surnames
Surnames from given names